The Palauan passport is an international travel document that is issued to Palauan citizens which is issued centrally at the Passport Office in Meyuns, Palau.

History
Issuance of the Palauan passport began on 8 December 1994, whilst official and diplomatic passports were first issued on 9 December 1994.

In accordance with law RPPL7-3, on 31 December 2006, all non-machine readable Palauan passports automatically expired and from 1 January 2007 onwards, only machine readable Palauan passports are valid travel documents, even if a non-machine readable passport has not yet reached its expiry date.

Visa requirements

As of 2 July 2019, Palauan citizens had visa-free or visa on arrival access to 118 countries and territories, ranking the Palauan passport 50th in terms of travel freedom according to the Henley Passport Index.

Palau signed a mutual visa waiver agreement with Schengen Area countries on 7 December 2015.

Application
Applying for an ordinary Palauan passport currently costs USD50.

References

See also
Visa requirements for Palauan citizens

Palau
Passports by country